Bashe Mohamed Farah (Arabic: باشى محمد فارح) is a Somali politician who was the speaker of the House of Representatives of Somaliland.

Career 
Farah began his political career in 2005, when he was elected to Somaliland's House of Representatives as a member for the Sool region. He then was appointed deputy speaker in 2012, and served in that capacity until 2017 when he was elected Speaker of the House after the resignation of his predecessor, Abdirahman Mohamed Abdullahi.

References 

Somaliland politicians
People from Las Anod
Speakers of the House of Representatives (Somaliland)
Living people
Year of birth missing (living people)